Shoji Oguma (大熊 正二 born July 22, 1951 in Koriyama, Japan) is a Japanese former professional boxer who held the WBC and Lineal titles in the Flyweight division.

Professional career 
Oguma turned pro in 1970 and in 1974 won the WBC Flyweight Title by winning a split decision over Betulio González. He lost the title three months later in his first defense against Miguel Canto. In 1976, Oguma challenged WBA Flyweight champion Alfonso Lopez but lost a majority decision. In 1978 he landed a rematch with WBC Flyweight champion Canto but came up short with a split decision loss. Later that year he fought his third bout with Canto, and this time lost a more clear unanimous decision to complete their trilogy.
In 1979 he rematched WBA Flyweight champion Gonzalez and the result was a draw. Later that year they fought a rematch and Gonzalez came up with the victory via a 12th-round KO in their third match.

Winning the lineal championship 
In 1980 Oguma landed a shot at WBC and Lineal Flyweight Champion Chan-Hee Park and KO'd Park in the 9th round to capture the titles. He defended the titles twice the same year, including a split decision over Park, and his annual performance was named Ring magazine Comeback of the Year for 1980. 
In 1981 Oguma defended the titles successfully again against Park, but lost the belts in his following bout by KO to Antonio Avelar. He then moved up in weight and in 1982 took on WBA Super Flyweight Title holder Jiro Watanabe, but was TKO'd in the 12th. Oguma retired after the bout.

See also 
List of flyweight boxing champions
List of WBC world champions
List of Japanese boxing world champions
Boxing in Japan

References

External links 
 
 Shoji Oguma - CBZ Profile

1951 births
Flyweight boxers
Living people
People from Kōriyama
World Boxing Council champions
World flyweight boxing champions
World boxing champions
Japanese male boxers
Sportspeople from Fukushima Prefecture